Minuscule 528 (in the Gregory-Aland numbering), ε 147 (in Soden's numbering), is a Greek minuscule manuscript of the New Testament, on a parchment. Palaeographically it has been assigned to the 11th century.
Scrivener labelled it by number 483.

Description 

The codex contains a complete text of the four Gospels on 354 parchment leaves (size ). It is written in one column per page, 20 lines per page.

There is also a division according to the Ammonian Sections (in Mark 234 Sections, the last Section in 16:9) with references to the Eusebian Canons.

It has also a few lectionary markings added by a later hand.

Text 

The Greek text of the codex is a representative of the Byzantine text-type. Hermann von Soden classified it to the textual family Kx. Aland placed it in Category V.
According to the Claremont Profile Method it represents the textual family Kx in Luke 1 and Luke 20. In Luke 10 no profile was made.

History 

In 1727 the manuscript was brought from the Pantokrator monastery on the Mount Athos to England. The manuscript was collated by Th. Mangey, Prebendary of Durham.

The manuscript was added to the list of New Testament minuscule manuscripts by F. H. A. Scrivener (483) and C. R. Gregory (528). Gregory saw it in 1883.

It is currently housed at the Bodleian Library (MS. Cromwell 16) in Oxford.

See also 

 List of New Testament minuscules
 Biblical manuscript
 Textual criticism

References

Further reading 

 

Greek New Testament minuscules
11th-century biblical manuscripts
Bodleian Library collection